The Száraz-ér is a right tributary of the river Mureș in Romania and Hungary. It discharges into the Mureș near Makó. It originates in the city of Arad and flows westwards crossing the border into Hungary near the village of Turnu. It flows through the towns Battonya and Tótkomlós before it enters the Mureș east of Makó. The river is entirely channelized and is integrated into the drainage system of the area.

Hydronymy 
The Hungarian name of the river means "(dry) brook". The Romanian name derives from that.

References

Rivers of Romania
Rivers of Arad County
Rivers of Hungary
International rivers of Europe